Yala City municipality Stadium is a multi-purpose stadium in Yala province, Thailand. The stadium has an athletic track but it is currently used mostly for football matches and is the home stadium of Yala F.C. The stadium has a capacity of 3,000.

References

Multi-purpose stadiums in Thailand
Buildings and structures in Yala province
Sport in Yala province